ShowBiz is a video editor by ArcSoft for the Windows operating system. It can create VCD and DVDs and can also export to the formats AVI, MPEG, WMV, and MOV. ShowBiz also contains a DVD burning and menu building feature.

As of 2003, it was one of the three most dominant bundled titles.

Reception
PC Magazine reviewer Jan Ozer states: "ArcSoft's ShowBiz has evolved into a competent editor that's generally more usable than Dazzle's MovieStar program, providing more configuration controls, better preview features, and a much greater range of fun effects."
John Virata, senior editor of Digital Media Online, says in his three page review of ShowBiz DVD 2, "It is an easy editor to work with and has a logically laid out interface that takes you step by step through the video creation and DVD creation process"

References

External links
Connected Home Magazine

Video editing software